The Riverside Shakespeare Company of New York City was founded in 1977 as a professional (AEA) theatre company on the Upper West Side of New York City, by W. Stuart McDowell and Gloria Skurski. Focusing on Shakespeare plays and other classical repertoire, it operated through 1997.
 


Establishment and heritage

Founded with a core of graduates from the University of California at Berkeley, the Riverside Shakespeare Company of New York City opened its first production, Romeo and Juliet, in August 1977 in Riverside Park. It then commenced a free parks tour through Manhattan, performing in Washington Square, John Jay Park, Fort Tryon Park, and Columbia University. The production was directed by McDowell.

An opening-night announcement in The New York Times read:

The Riverside Shakespeare Company is taking up where Joseph Papp left off this summer by presenting free Shakespeare in the park. ... The production will be done in traveling minstrel style, evocative of Shakespeare's time.  Beforehand, to set the period mood, performers will be scattered around the park – jugglers, fencers, singers, poetry readers.  Then a fanfare will call the players to the stage, and the tale of star-cross'd lovers will begin.

The inaugural production of Romeo and Juliet was a two-hour version, trimmed to incorporate extensive swordplay, an extended ballroom dance scene, and pantomime, such as the appearance to Juliet of Tybalt's ghost. Each performance was also timed to end with the setting of the sun in mid August.  Performances were preceded by the entire company of actors and musicians entertaining the audience with a Greenshow – a preshow spoof of the production to follow, that served the dual purpose of building a comedic, physical bridge between actor and audience, and of establishing a physical, spontaneous style of acting that incorporated the performance environment into the show. This drew on the roots of the company – and of Shakespeare – in the rich heritage of Commedia dell'arte.

The following autumn, the company began a series of readings of the works of Shakespeare, reading through the entire canon the first year.  Growing out of this, the company  inaugurated a series of free radio broadcasts of Shakespeare's works on the New York public radio station, WBAI.   A board of directors was soon formed under the guidance of founding chairperson, Elena Scotti of Lincoln Center.  At its founding in 1977, the Riverside Shakespeare Company became New York City's only year-round professional Shakespeare company dedicated to the performance of the works of Shakespeare, his contemporaries, and Commedia dell'arte.

Early years

During its inaugural 1977–1978 season, after its parks tour of Romeo & Juliet, the Riverside Shakespeare Company presented a free 'Equity library tour' of Twelfth Night, directed by Gloria Skurski, with music by Michael Moore, which then had an extended run Off Broadway at the Manhattan Theatre Club Stage 73. Judy Thrall, in the Heights/Inwood Press of North Manhattan reviewed the production of Twelfth Night:

Some theatre companies – those which start out with talented and intelligent actors – are born great.  Some companies – those which start out with diffident, inexperienced people who soon mature with their art – achieve greatness.  And some companies – those which start out untrained and unguided – can, with the advent of a brilliant force, have greatness thrust upon them.  In the first hyperbolic category is one of the city's newest theater groups, the Riverside Shakespeare Company. ... Now the group is well on its way to becoming an important theatrical force in Upper Manhattan and elsewhere.

First Folio production of the complete Hamlet

In the spring of 1978, the company mounted the complete Hamlet on the courtyard roof of Riverside Church in Manhattan in late afternoon.  The success of this production enabled the company to remount its Hamlet – this time lit by torches in the late evening – on the main University Walk before the Low Library at Columbia University, using a large stage surrounded by sheets of steel, erected to create a reflective environment for both the voice and the torch illumination. The production was designed and directed by W. Stuart McDowell and featured Peter Siiteri as Hamlet.

Riverside's Hamlet marked its first First Folio Production, in which the entire text of Shakespeare's play was presented in a lively, action-filled production, enabling the company to mount the complete Hamlet in under three hours.  A Greenshow also preceded each outdoor performance, entertaining the audience as they arrived in a spoof of the play to follow, which was staged by "the Players" en route to "Elsinore".

The torchlit performance of Hamlet at Columbia University was reviewed by Heights/Innwood Newspaper of North Manhattan:

Siiteri's sly innuendoes and elegant gestures as Hamlet were put to good use.  His reactions in his father's ghost and in Ophelia's death had traces of the vulnerability and humanity seen in the finest Hamlets.  Others in the cast ranged from very good to superb. Kaeren Peregrin as Ophelia gave a chilling "mad scene".  Robert Lanchester as Claudius was delightfully depraved, and Frank Fico as Polonius was wonderfully amusing without turning the endearing and gentleman into a buffoon.  Bravo also to John Rowe as Laertes. ... All of the actors projected magnificently without the aid of microphones – and this in the open air!

Expanded tour of A Midsummer Night's Dream

In its second summer, 1978, the company presented a popular free tour of A Midsummer Night's Dream, with Eric Hoffmann as Puck, Karen Hurley as Titania, and Eric Conger as Oberon, directed by Gloria Skurski. An original score by Deborah Awner was performed by the touring group "Brass". The production continued the tradition of un-miked Shakespeare, making use of a sheet-steel touring set for natural amplification of both actors and musicians.

The parks tour of A Midsummer Night's Dream was expanded to play locations in two boroughs of New York City, including Wave Hill in the Bronx, which became a favorite annual summer performing site for the company.  The tour included an extended residency at the International Affairs Plaza on the campus of Columbia University, which allowed the company to keep the stage standing overnight, rather than the usual strike after each performance.

In what was becoming a Riverside tradition, each performance was preceded a half hour before curtain by a "Greenshow" of Commedia entertainment, by the cast and musicians on the stage and throughout the audience.

Erika Munk of the Village Voice wrote:

Shakespeare at the Delacorte always disappoints me because it's overmiked and not in tune with park life; but I saw a charming Midsummer Night's Dream by the Riverside Shakespeare Company: no mikes, no lights, no seats; only clever placement at the bottom of Soldier and Sailors Monument to give the audience a view from the steps; broad acting and old-fashioned projection so that everyone could follow; an ability to capitalize on the audience's pre-disposition to enjoy itself; the flexibility to deal with dogs, kids, jets, and drunks; and splendid timing – the play ended as the sun went down.

As You Like It at Manhattan Theatre Club's Stage 73

The following fall the company staged As You Like It at the Manhattan Theatre Club's Stage 73, featuring Robert Boyle, Timothy Hall, Margo Gruber and Caryn West – all making their New York stage debut; with Kent Odell, Jim Maxson, Stuart Rudin, Ken Grantham, Timothy Hall, Peter Jensen, Kenneth Lane, Gannon McHale, Sheri Meyers, Uriel Menson, Brock Seawell, Daniel Tamm, and David Robert Westfall (stage manager), and directed by Eric Hoffmann, with set designed by David Lockner, costumes by Deborah Otte, lighting by Nat Cohen, and music by Deborah Awner.

Hoffmann set Shakespeare's most pastoral play with an autumnal setting in Colonial American, using leaves gathered from Central Park, which gradually filled the stage with knee-deep piles of leaves, and underscored with original guitar music played by Robert Mamary and Joseph Poshek. The production was acclaimed for its creative setting in this bucolic, pre-American revolutionary time, in which Amiens, played by Larry Kirchgaessner, became a Native American in the American forest of Arden.

The production was attended by Mildred Natwick, who became the company's first member of its Board of Advisors, soon to be followed by Helen Hayes.  At this production, it was announced that the company's ultimate goal was "to build a replica of Shakespeare's Globe Theater on the banks of the Hudson River in New York City."

New York premiere of the "madrigal comedy" L'Amfiparnaso
The production of As You Like It was joined at Stage 73 by the New York premiere of the Commedia dell'arte scenario, the 16th century "madrigal comedy" by Orazio Vecchi, L'Amfi Parnasso, directed by Dan Southern featuring company members performing with Renaissance music arranged and played by the chamber group The Western Wind.  This production was the company's first purely Commedia dell'arte style production, and featured the use of hand-crafted leather masks, improvisation, stylized movement and comic lazzi.

The professional Shakespeare company at Columbia University

From 1978 to 1980, the Riverside Shakespeare Company was the professional Equity theater company in residence at Columbia University under the sponsorship of Andrew B. Harris and internationally renowned Shakespeare scholar Bernard Beckerman, with audition, construction, storage and rehearsal spaces in Prentice Hall on West 125th Street west of Broadway, just a stone's throw from the Hudson River.  A core company of twelve to fifteen professional actors were often complemented with Columbia University students both backstage and onstage as performers, working as student apprentices within the company, not unlike Shakespeare's company 400 years before.

Tom Hanks and Michael Wolff in Machiavelli's The Mandrake

In 1979 the Riverside Shakespeare Company mounted Niccolo Machiavelli's Renaissance farce, The Mandrake, in the large second floor auditorium of the Casa Italiana of Columbia University located at West 117th and Amsterdam Avenue.

The Casa Italiana, which had recently been designated by the Landmarks Preservation Commission, proved an ideal setting for production: Riverside's Florentine set was surrounded by the Florentine architecture, wrought iron chandeliers, and Italian antiques, some donated by Premier Benito Mussolini when the building was erected in 1926.

Performing in the style of Commedia dell'arte, with masks and fanciful commedia costumes, the cast included Arland Russell, Mark Cavalieri, Jeff Cameron, Tom Hanks, Susan Kay Logan, Perla Armanasco and Michael Goldner.  In this production Tom Hanks played the lead role of the scoundrel Callimaco – in his first and only stage production in New York City until making his Broadway debut in Nora Ephron's "Lucky Guy" in spring 2013.

The production of The Mandrake was cast and rehearsed in the company's fourth floor facility of Columbia University's Prentise Hall in southern Harlem, and was directed by company member Dan Southern (then Daniel O. Smith), The production was played with authentic leather masks and fanciful costumes conceived and constructed by Broadway designer Jane Stein, period sets – including a raked checkerboard stage – designed and built by Gerard Bourcier, lighting (which incorporated the wrought iron chandeliers of the Casa Italiana) by John B. Forbes, and produced by Gloria Skurski and W. Stuart McDowell.  In the Heights/Inwood Press of North Manhattan review of March 14, 1979, Jan Rucquoi noted that:

A delightfully produced, fast-paced farce happened uptown on Columbia University's Campus, in the Casa Italiana. ... In The Mandrake the audience is often brought into the confidence of the actors who unmask themselves to do so.

The leather masks designed by Stein were often used inventively to comic effect, with actors sometimes removing them for an inner monologue, as in Hanks' portrayal of Callimaco, in which he conversed to himself while holding his quarter mask to one side.

The Mandrake was accompanied by an original jazz score composed (and with a running improvised narration) by pianist-composer-orchestra leader Michael Wolff.  According to the Heights/Inwood Press of North Manhattan:

The music composed for the play had a Brechtian feel to it, enriching the play and setting the mood of high jinks and fun.  Also, the fanciful costumes, works of art in themselves, with their overblown appliqued ornamentation, were a delightful asset to the production.

The production of The Mandrake opened on March 2, 1979 at the Casa Italiana, and was stage managed by Nancy Consentino Minckler and produced by W. Stuart McDowell and Gloria Skurski, in association with Columbia University.

Much Ado at Manhattan Theatre Club's Stage 73 
In late spring of 1979 the company produced Much Ado About Nothing directed by Gloria Skurski  with original music by Deborah Awner, with Margo Gruber and Gannon McHale, and Timothy Oman, Jim Brewster, Robert Boyle, Ronald Lew Harris, David Florek, Arland Russell, Daniel Tam and Leigh Podgorski, at Manhattan Theatre Club's Stage 73. The production was set in the roaring 20's, as if F. Scott Fitzgerald had imagined the meeting of Beatrice and Benedict at a festive garden party on Cape Cod.

The production of Much Ado About Nothing was staged as the first part of a double bill, followed by a glass of wine and then, on the same stage with a quick change of scenery, by Niccolo Machiavelli's The Mandrake.

The Mandrake at Stage 73, and on tour through New York City 
The success of Riverside's production of The Mandrake enabled the company to remount the show with the company's new production of Much Ado About Nothing as a late night double bill in repertory at Manhattan Theatre Club's Stage 73.  With the departure of Hanks to the west coast at the end of the run at the Casa Italiana, Dan Southern took over the role of Callimaco for the late night cabaret-like performances.

Subsequent to its two indoor stagings, The Mandrake was revived for several outdoor engagements, performed on a two-wheel cart with simple cloth backdrop, beginning with the dedication of the Shakespeare Garden in the Brooklyn, hosted by Joseph Papp, Estelle Parsons and W. Stuart McDowell.  The role of Callimaco was assumed by the play's director, Dan Southern. A small cart stage with canvas backdrop was used. The openness of staging, in natural sunlight and without the trappings and concealments of an indoor theatre, was typical of the performance style of Commedia dell'arte, in which the audience members are constantly made aware of the artifice of the production, and thereby become participants in the theatrical event

As in the Riverside tradition of the Greenshow, the production of The Mandrake – whether indoors or outside in a park – relied on broad physicalization, improvisation, and comic lazzi, as well as interacting with the audience in the manner of Commedia dell'arte.  The Mandrake, under Southern's direction, proved one of Riverside's most successful Commedia productions to date, and helped the company to realize its goal of bringing the work of Shakespeare, his contemporaries and Commedia dell'arte to as broad an audience as possible.  It also helped to further the reputation of the company as a versatile classical theatre company in New York City.

First Folio production of Henry IV, Part One
The company then mounted its first History Play by Shakespeare.  In the late spring of 1979, after two months rehearsal of the armies of King Henry and Hotspur on the rooftop of Columbia University's Prentice Hall in southern Harlem, the company opened its third annual outdoor production of free Shakespeare, a major Equity staging of the complete Henry IV, Part One.  This was Riverside's second First Folio Production, mounted on a replica of Shakespeare's Globe Theater, constructed on the courtyard roof Prentise Hall at West 125th and Broadway, and transported and erected on the main campus Quad of Columbia University.

The cast featured Dan Southern as Hotspur and Jason Moehring as Hal, with Eric Hoffmann as Falstaff and William Hanauer as King Henry, and a cast of forty including Jim Brewster, Mary Skinner, Vit Horejs, David Murray Jaffe, Kathleen Monteleone, Jason Moehring, Julia Murray, Gay Reed, John Miller, Ken Threet, Nick Schatzki, and Lois Tibbetts, with music by Deborah Awner played by a live orchestra.

For this production, the company built a replica of Shakespeare's Globe Theater outdoors, surrounded by trees on the southeast corner of the Columbia University Quad; the production was directed by W. Stuart McDowell and performed at night without microphones in this perfect acoustic environment, on a set designed and built by Dorian Vernacchio, costumes by Kenneth M. Yount, fight choreography for broadsword, halberd, dagger and mace, by Joel Leffert.

The reviewer of Show Business, Ted Bank, noted that:

Riverside Shakespeare Company has injected this chronicle history with all the pageantry and spectacle it calls for, and the result is exciting theatre. ... What makes Henry IV, Part One so delightful is that Riverside Shakespeare Company has taken pains to bring historical detail into the production.  Going into its third season as New York's only year-round Shakespeare producer, Riverside has established a fine reputation for producing high-quality classic theatre."

The popularity of Henry IV, Part IV at Columbia University enabled the company to extend the run by remounting the entire production Off Broadway indoors at the American Theatre for Actors in midtown Manhattan in the fall of 1979.

Twelfth Night at Riverside Church 
In the spring of 1980, the theatre company mounted a new production of Twelfth Night, set in an Art Nouveau style, directed by John Clingerman, with Andrew Achsen, Kristin Rudrud, Stuart Cohen, Alison Edwards, Beata Jachulski, Will Lecki, Scott Parson, Bruce Altman, Ken Threet, and Ted Polites, staged in the round (with audiences on four sides) in the lower chamber of Riverside Church in Manhattan, featuring music by Deborah Awner.  This production was one of many that the theatre company opened on Shakespeare's birthday, April 23; this time, the production was inaugurated by a special celebration, culminating with the reading of a Shakespearean sonnet by the pastor of Riverside Church, fellow Bardophile, Rev. William Sloan Coffin.

The Shakespeare Center

Early in the summer of 1980, the Riverside Shakespeare Company moved into residence in West Park Presbyterian Church, at the corner of West 86th and Amsterdam, where it established The Shakespeare Center, dedicated to the year round training for the performance of the works of Shakespeare, his contemporaries, and Commedia dell'arte. Professional actor Andrew Achsen played a key role in securing the site in the church, of which he was a member, together with the pastor of West Park, Rev. Robert Davidson.  The Theatre of The Shakespeare Center was reconstructed from materials from the demolition of Broadway's Helen Hayes Theatre and the set of Broadway's Nicholas Nickleby through funds raised by efforts of cast members from the Broadway production of Nicholas Nickleby from the Royal Shakespeare Company. The Shakespeare Center of the Riverside Shakespeare Company was officially dedicated in the fall of 1982 by Joseph Papp and Helen Hayes in a ceremony attended by Gloria Foster, Milo O'Shea, Barnard Hughes, Sam Waterston, Mildred Natwick, and Peter Brook. 
  
The Shakespeare Center became the home for numerous Equity Riverside productions, beginning with Romeo and Juliet in 1980, directed by W. Stuart McDowell, assisted by Jay King, with Robert Walsh, Arleigh Richards, George House, Barbara Tirrell, Joe Meek, Gay Reed, Curtis Watkins, Dan Johnson, Obie Story, James McGuire, Jim Maxson, Christopher Cull, Timothy Oman, and, as the Nurse, Scottish folk singer and comedian Fredi Dundee.

Romeo & Juliet was followed by Love's Labour's Lost with Freda Kavanagh, Deanna Deignan, Kay Colburn and Catherine Schmidt, and J. C. Hoyt, Timothy Doyle, Timothy Oman, Madeleine Potter, and Peter Siiteri, directed by Clingerman with music by Deborah Awner, which Mel Gussow of the New York Times called "a charming chamber piece."

This was followed by a Commedia dell'arte production of Two Gentlemen of Verona directed by Dan Southern produced Off Broadway in the American Theatre for Actors, with music by Bob Rosen, with Ronald Lew Harris, Jim Maxson, Joe Meek, Amy Aquino, Allison Edwards, Dennis Pfister, and J. C. Hoyt.

While the company produced a subscription season in 1980–1981 at The Shakespeare Center, it also mounted a series of free performances of Shakespeare plays and scenes across town at the Citicorp Center, entitled Riverside Shakespeare Salutes Shakespeare at Citicorp, which included The Taming of the Shrew directed by Jere O'Donnell, Love's Labour's Lost directed by Timothy Minor, The Will to Power: Scenes of Ambition and Political Intrigue, directed by Ken Grantham, and a popular compilation of romantic scenes from the Bard, This Bud of Love: Scenes of Awakening Love, directed by John Clingerman.  These were also broadcast on New York's public radio station, WBAI.

Meanwhile at The Shakespeare Center, the company opened its next season with Henry V directed by Timothy Oman, assisted by Linda Mason, associate director, and Maureen Clarke, Riverside's resident text coach, with music by Sanchie Borrow, scenic and lighting design by Norbert U. Kolb, fight direction by Conal O'Brien, and costumes by David Pearson, featuring Frank Muller and Lee Croghan, with Dene Nardi, Dan Daily, Norma Fire, Ronald Lew Harris, Pat Kennerly, Gay Reed, Gene Santarelli, Sandi Shackelford, and Time Winters.

New York premiere of The Three Cuckolds
In February 1981 the company mounted the New York Premiere of the Commedia dell'arte farce The Three Cuckolds with Perla Armanasco, Jim Brewster, Ronald Lew Harris, David Murray Jaffe, Joe Meek, Jim Maxson, and Jane Badgers, Lloyd Davis, Jr. (as an "outstanding" Arlecchino), Oded Carmi and Marla Buck, directed by Dan Southern with an original score by Michael Canick, sepia drops depicting contemporary New York street scenes by Dorian Vernacchio costumes by Barbara Weiss and masks by Paul Mantell, about which Marilyn Stasio of the New York Post wrote:

The resident company under Daniel O. Smith's stage direction, has enthusiastically caught the outrageous spirit of that venerable theater form. ... The stock characters of commedia – from the bulbous-nosed clowns, the zanni, to that nimble trickster Arlecchino – are all authentically masked, padded and caricatured.  And the cast's high level of comic energy makes them perfectly ridiculous. ... In keeping with the improvisational tradition of commedia, the production injects a contemporary tone into the material ... including a graffiti mural, which is wittier than the stuff you read on the IRT.  And somebody tossed off a Nancy Reagan joke that tickled me.

The production of The Three Cuckolds was performed in a broad farcical style with numerous contemporary references, and extensive use of acrobatics, such as a backflip performed by Jim Brewster on his entrance as the young lover.  The Three Cuckolds proved so popular, that it was later mounted as an Off Broadway touring production, and was the first Riverside production seen by Joseph Papp, leading eventually to an ongoing sponsorship by the New York Shakespeare Festival beginning with Edward II (see below), and subsequent Riverside summer touring productions.

New York premiere of Brecht's The Life of Edward II of England

Beginning in 1982 Joseph Papp and the New York Shakespeare Festival became the principal sponsors of the company, starting with the Riverside Shakespeare Company's production of the New York Premiere of Bertolt Brecht's adaptation of Christopher Marlowe's The Life of Edward II of England in 1982, also sponsored by the Goethe House of New York, and by Marta Feuchtwanger (widow of Brecht's acknowledged co-author Lion Feuchtwanger).

The New York premiere of Edward II was grounded on interviews McDowell had made in Germany with cast members – Erwin Faber and Hans Schweikart – of the original Munich production of 1924, which had been Brecht's debut as stage director.  In the original 1924 production, Brecht developed many of his "new staging and dramaturgical techniques" for what came to be known as epic theatre, and which eventually profoundly impacted 20th century theatre.  Elements from Brecht's original production became a springboard for interpreting the script, seventy-eight years later.

The Riverside Shakespeare production featured an original score composed by Michael Canick for percussion and played by percussionist Noel Council above and to the side of the audience in the side tower that had been erected within the theatre of The Shakespeare Center of the newly renovated theatre.  The score made use of snare and kettledrums, of xylophones and castanets, as well as natural percussion sounds made by the cast, using rattles and hand-held pea-pods played during the transitions between scenes, all intended to give an environment of sound intended to augment and draw focus to various narrative lines throughout the production.

The Riverside production of Edward II featured Dan Southern and Timothy Oman in the roles of Gaveston and King Edward, with Andrew Achsen, Larry Attille, Christopher Cull, Michael Franks, Margo Gruber, Daniel T. Johnson, Will Lampe, Joe Meek, Jason Moehring, Gay Reed, Count Stovall, R. Patrick Sullivan and Jeffery V. Thompson, directed by McDowell, with assistant director Jeannie H. Woods, with sets and lights by Dorian Vernacchio, costumes by David Robinson, with hand-hewn wooden props designed and built by Valerie Kuehn.

According to singer/writer William Warfield:

I've never seen a classical theatre production by this company before, and I thought it was truly exceptional.  As unimpassioned as most so-called entertainment is, the only saving grace is that artists still band together on honest endeavors, such as this. ... Edward II was brilliant. Edward II was visually stunning, and imaginatively directed production of a play that has great relevance today.

Opening night, a special panel of scholars on German theatre and the drama of the Weimar Republic in particular was presented in the theatre before the play, including a display of photos from the original Munich production.  In keeping with Brecht's original production, a Weimar Cabaret followed the production, with cast member Andrew Achsen serving as host.

Subscription season at the Shakespeare Center

Richard III with brass and chorus

The next season (1982–1983) in the newly renovated theatre on West 86th Street began with Richard III, about which Marilyn Stasio of The New York Post wrote:

The Riverside Shakespeare Company has opened its season with a Richard III that handsomely advances its suit for support as a year-round professional Shakespeare ensemble worth taking seriously.  The production has been mounted in observance of the 500th anniversary of that infamous monarch's feverish rise to power.  J. Kenneth Campbell makes his entrance hump-first, from an obviously symbolic hole in the ground, and grabs us from the moment he launches into his wintry discontents. Campbell not only loves his character, he loves his words, articulating with the lusty relish of a voluptuary set loose in a seraglio.  It's a joy to watch him.

Richard III was directed by John Clingerman, with an original musical score by Joe Church played by the New York City Brass Quintet and large chorus recorded especially for this production, about which Backstage wrote, "Particular mention should be made of the music, conducted by Joseph Church with the New York City Brass Quintet and a large chorus contributed to the fifteenth century ambience and aided in unifying the production.".

The production featured stage and screen veteran J. Kenneth Campbell in the title role, Marya Lowery, Richard Hoyt-Miller, Scott Parson, Maggie Scott, Mary McTigue, and Ann Ducati, sets by Tom Newman, costumes by Randolf Pearson, lighting by Richard Lund, extensive combat choreography by Joel Leffert, and stage managed by Mary Ellen Allison.

The complete The Winter's Tale in a blizzard

In early 1983, Riverside Shakespeare Company mounted its third First Folio Production, an uncut staging of The Winter's Tale, with Eric Hoffmann as Autolycus and Tony Award-winning actress Tonya Pinkins in her New York stage debut as "Mopsa – a shepherdess", with Marya Lowry and Timothy Oman as Hermione and Leontes, C. B. Anderson, Franklin Brown, Sally Kay Brown, Lee Croghan, Christopher Cull, Virginia Downing, Freda Kavanaugh, Beatrix Porter, and Richie Devaney.  The production was directed by W. Stuart McDowell, with costumes by Randolph Pearson, original music by Joseph Church, choreography by Beatrix Porter, text coaching by Maureen Clarke, and was stage managed by Mary Ellen Allison.

The production combined modern (Grace Kelly's Monaco) and historical (pastoral 18th century England) periods in a concept centered around a magical transformation that takes place when Mamillius begins to recount "the winter's tale" to his mother, Hermione.  The concept arose from the moment in the First Folio text when Mamillius is asked to "tell's a Tale," to which the boy responds with "There was a man ... dwelt by a Church-yard. ... "

According to the Riverside program, McDowell's interpretation posited that these eight words – the entirety of "the winter's tale" – are nothing less than a prophecy concerning Leontes, Mamillius' father, who would some day virtually dwell by a graveyard, mourning the passing of Hermione and Mamillius (Act III, Sc. ii. Leontes: "Once a day I'll visit/The chapel where they lie, and tears shed there/Shall be my recreation ...") – whose deaths he causes in the subsequent parable told by Mamillius. Both Hermione and story-teller Mamillius (who also played the role of Time in the Riverside production) are resurrected magically at the play's end, as his "sad tale ... best for Winter" draws to a conclusion, and the purpose of the lad's tale has been fulfilled.

During rehearsals for The Winter's Tale the company was virtually stranded in the theatre during the blizzard that hit New York City in mid-February 1983.  The technical crew building the set had to spend the night in The Shakespeare Center, marooned there while they finished the elaborate, magical stage for production.  Fortunately, the deli just outside the theatre – Barney Greengrass: "the Sturgeon King" – was open the next day, providing the crew with bagels and coffee in the morning.  Shakespeare's tale of Winter proved a fitting production for New York's year-round Shakespeare company to be socked in while the city nearly ground to a halt.

After the opening on February 24, Riverside's The Winter's Tale was broadcast on New York's WBAI, before which it was described as, "An exceptional production of one of the Bard's seldom-produced scripts ... brilliant."  In the New York Shakespeare Bulletin it was observed that "Riverside's responsible rendering of the text should win them a Julio Romano statue that will never walk away."

The Taming of the Shrew

Later that year the company mounted Taming of the Shrew in 1983 directed by Robert Mooney with music by Joseph Church and set designs by Kevin Lee Allen, with Diane Ciesla and Dan Southern, and Ronald Lew Harris, Eric Hoffmann, Joe Meek, and Robert Mooney.  About this production, Sy Isenberg of Bulletin of the New York Shakespeare Society wrote:

This production of The Taming of the Shrew really cares ... I cannot think of a piece in recent memory that has been so deliciously cast.  The whole cast is swimmingly on their toes.  As the primary lovers not meant for each other Diane Ciesla and Daniel Southern are dazzling ... The couple's subsequent extravagances are part of a complicated mating dance at once witty, slapstick and tender, balanced at the end between ritual and reality. In its warmth, elegance and festivity, this Kate kisses us all.

The Tempest with Bertram Ross
The next season opened with a full stage production of The Tempest with Bertram Ross – longtime leading dance partner with Martha Graham and co-director of the Graham dance company – as Prospero, and featuring Eric Hoffmann, Ronald Lew Harris, Joe Meek, Kathleen Bishop, Ellen Cleghorne, Alexander Cook, Herman Petras, John Reese, and Laurine Towler as Ariel, directed by Robert Mooney, with dance choreography by Shela Xoregos set to music by Joe Church, and sets by Kevin Lee Allen. Bertram Ross, who has been called the "dance legend and archetype male Graham dancer", used his considerable dance experience and technique and deep voice to create a memorable Prospero, using movement choreographed by Xoregos, who molded Prospero and Ariel into a "moving duo of poetic form."

Modern dress CAESAR! and historic The History of King Lear

In 1984 the company presented a modern dress version of Julius Caesar, entitled CAESAR! set in contemporary Washington, directed by McDowell, inspired by interviews conducted with company members of Orson Welles's famous 1937 Broadway production of Caesar, with set by Kevin Lee Allen, with Assistant Director Maureen Clarke and Jane Badgers, director of marketing & P.R, and featuring music by Michael Canick.

The production featured Obie Award–winner Harold Scott, and Marya Lowry, with Michael Cook, Andy Achsen, Ronald Lew Harris, Paul Hebron, Sonja Lanzener, Jim Maxson, Joe Meek, Robert Walsh and Herman Petras as Caesar.

The production proved immensely popular with audiences, setting, as it did, Shakespeare's play in contemporary Washington, D.C. in a country on the verge of making its popular leader president for life. The production of CAESAR, revised, was subsequently optioned by Samuel H. Scripps for a Broadway production at the Virginia Theatre, scheduled to premiere on the 50th anniversary of the Mercury Theatre production, on November 11, 1987.

The slogan for the production was reflected on its poster:

It's America.
It's 1984.
It's the political horror show for our times.

Responding to the production, Sy Syna of the New York Tribune wrote: "Riverside's CAESAR! is not only a rock solid production, it is surprisingly a good one."  Reviewing the Riverside production, Herbert Mitgang of the New York Times wrote:

The famous Mercury Theater production of Julius Caesar in modern dress staged by Orson Welles in 1937 was designed to make audiences think of Mussolini's Blackshirts – and it did. The Riverside Shakespeare Company's lively production makes you think of timeless ambition and anti-libertarians anywhere.

The History of King Lear
In 1985 the Riverside Shakespeare Company presented the New York premiere of The History of King Lear, adapted with a happy ending by 18th-century English Poet Laureate, Nahum Tate, from William Shakespeare's King Lear.  The production was directed by W. Stuart McDowell, produced by Andrew B. Harris, who had joined Riverside as its executive director at the beginning of the season.

The production featured a complete, original score for harpsichord and orchestra by John Aschenbrenner, fights choreographed by Richard Raether, lighting by Sam Scripps, and a period wind machine in the wings.  The Riverside production displayed a harpsichord to one side, as if in the wings, and a wind machine to the other – both visible to the audience.

Tate's adaptation of The History of King Lear, which restored the authentic legend of the ancient king, was written without a Fool, added a confidante and a romance for Cordelia and Edgar, and culminated with the triumph of good over evil with the restoration of Lear to the throne with Kent and Gloucester at his side, and the marriage of Cordelia to Edgar. 
 

Like Tate's other immensely popular "happy ending" version of Romeo and Juliet (which was a central part of the Royal Shakespeare Company's production of Nicholas Nickleby) Tate's equally popular adaptation of Shakespeare's King Lear was the only performed version of King Lear for over 150 years, beginning in the late 17th century when Tate wrote his adaptation, through the early 19th century.

Riverside mounted this historical piece in an 18th-century setting, with authentic period costumes by Ellen Seeling on a set designed by Norbert Kolb.  The production featured Barbara Tirrell, Frank Muller and Margo Gruber as Goneril, Edmund and Regan, with Eric Hoffmann as Lear, Dan Daily as Kent, Freda Kavanagh as Cordelia, Don Fischer as Edgard, and Saunder Finard, Sandra Protor Gray, Buck Hobbs, E. F. Morrill, Gene Santarelli, and Richard Willis.

The reviewer for the New York City Tribune wrote:

The Riverside Shakespeare production of The History of King Lear includes a raked stage designed by Norbert Kolb, gorgeous costumes by Ellen Seeling, a visible stage hand operating the wind machine and handing on props, a maestro conducting John Aschenbrenner's lively score composed mostly for harpsichord with several interpolated songs including one by Garrick, and a whole panoply of 18th century theater devices, including a hysterical use of tableaux to open and close scenes, and hilarious asides including one when Edmund (deliciously played by Frank Muller) is hard at it with one of the rival sisters. ... Shakespearean adaptations occur in any era.  This one, besides putting a leer in Lear was a helluva lot of fun!

Riverside Shakespeare tours produced by Joseph Papp

In 1982, Riverside Shakespeare Company began a series of expanded tours of Free Summer Shakespeare made possible through sponsorship by Joseph Papp and the New York Shakespeare Festival.  These were all produced under an Off Broadway contract with the Actors' Equity Association, and, with broadened marketing, proved exceedingly popular with audiences at these extended venues.

The Comedy of Errors
The first of these was a tour – to twelve different parks in four boroughs – of Shakespeare's raucous A Comedy of Errors directed by Gloria Skurski, with costumes by Barbara Weiss, on a touring set designed by Dorian Vernacchio.  The cast featured Connor Smith and Andrew Achsen, and Ronald Lew Harris, Karen Jackson, Dan Johnson, Will Lampe, Erin Lanagan, Trip Plymale, Mel Winkler and Dan Woods. The production featured a magician, a belly dancer accompanied by a lively percussion score composed and played by Michael Canick, and a very broad comedic performance style that proved extremely popular with its audiences. Opening night Joseph Papp arrived with an enormous basket of fruit for the cast to thank them for their performance in 90 degree heat.

"The Basin Street Bard"

The following summer the company mounted a music-filled production of The Merry Wives of Windsor set in old, post-Civil War New Orleans and directed by Timothy Oman, with Maureen Clarke as assistant director, featuring ragtime music by Deena Kaye.  The cast featured Anna Deavere Smith in her New York stage debut playing Mistress Quickly as a "Cajun voodoo woman" and Joseph Reed as Falstaff, with Douglas Broyles, Dan Daily, Norma Fire, Paul Hebron, Michael Landsman, Sonja Lanzener, Warren Sweeney, Shelly Desai, and stage managed by Mary Ellen Allison.

In the hands of composer and keyboard player Deena Kaye, the Riverside production of The Merry Wives of Windsor verged on becoming a full-fledged musical, with numerous tunes played by the ragtime band.  According to Nan Robertson in The New York Times:

An eight piece ragtime band and Mardi Gras high jinks underscored the slapstick performance, which sometimes evoked the spastic look and ricky-tick musical accompaniment of a very early silent flicker movie.  The cast is costumed as 19th-century Southern belles, beaux and bums, the last group being the disreputable lecherous but appealing Falstaff.  During the intermission, a barroom quartet singing "A Woman is only a Woman, but a Good Cigar is a Smoke" brought down the house. ... This is the second season under the aegis of Joseph Papp. ... The company is now calling its production of The Merry Wives of Windsor an "evening with the Basin Street Bard."

Clive Barnes, in his first review of a Riverside Shakespeare production, wrote in the New York Post:

The Riverside Shakespeare owes its name to the fact that it started operations in Riverside Park, so it was a sort of homecoming for them when I caught the company in a glade in that park just by 82nd Street ... The production is modern and carefree – the kind of innovative Shakespeare that [Joseph] Papp himself favors, and appropriate for a bright summer evening, with people squatting on the grass, many of them enjoying an alfresco picnic.  Director Timothy Oman has placed the play in New Orleans soon after the Civil War.  The idea works quite well.  The play is preceded by a sort of Mardi Gras revel, and in the intermission we are regaled with a few vaudeville songs of the period, including a somewhat odd barbershop quartet. ... This is one of the most purely farcical of Shakespeare's plays, and it stands up well to the present knockabout, roustabout treatment it receives from these Riverside players.

The Riverside Greenshow
For each of these summer tours sponsored by Joseph Papp and the New York Shakespeare Festival, the traditional Greenshow  performed before each outdoor touring production—which involved live musicians and the entire cast often performing Commedia-like spoofs of the performance to follow – became the festive call of the audience to the stage, and an important part of Riverside's performance tradition.

Romeo and Juliet on the mobile stage
The next summer, in 1984, the Riverside Shakespeare Company mounted a summer parks tour of its third production of Romeo and Juliet directed by John Clingerman with music by Michael Roth played by percussionist David Nicholson, fight choreography by Robert Walsh, on a set designed by Kevin Lee Allen and costumes by Cecilia A. Frederichs, with Michael Golding, Constance Boardman, Saul Stein, Todd Jamieson and Jeff Shoemaker.

For this production, the company secured $15,000 from New York Telephone to overhaul the mobile stage that been used by the New York Shakespeare Festival for parks tours before the NYSF stopped touring four years before.  According to Newsday:

It takes six stagehands using hydraulic lift and plenty of muscle, several hours to rig the contents into the Verona of Shakespeare's love-stricken youth. ... "It's sunset Shakespeare", said W. Stuart McDowell, the Riverside's artistic director, "designed to be performed in natural light the way it was in Shakespeare's time."

The production opened at the Bandshell in New York's Central Park to an audience estimated at over a thousand (according to Newsday).  This was the first time Riverside Shakespeare Company had ventured into New York's Central Park – the traditional territory of the New York Shakespeare Festival. Opening on June 6, 1984 saw a "Gala Benefit" hosted by Lucille Lortel, Richard Horner and Lynne Stuart. Opening night, Joseph Papp joined W. Stuart McDowell on the touring stage, and inaugurated the five borough tour in a special ceremony in which Mr. Papp compared Riverside's tour with the former tours of the NYSF:

They're a marvelous bunch of actors.  And they have what it takes for this sort of thing—They carry things on their backs ... We used to make deals with local gangs.  One time I remember well.  I told this kid that he had to move because he was backstage.  He said to me, "This ain't backstage; it's first base!"

The old mobile unit could not withstand the rigors of a month-long, outdoor tour of transporting "fair Verona" to the five boroughs of New York City. The mobile unit had to be permanently retired, but the tour continued with select pieces of scenery, such as Juliet's balcony, and the production continued to play to exceptionally large audiences across the five boroughs.

The Taming of the Shrew
In 1985, the company mounted a very Italian version of The Taming of the Shrew with music by Frank Lindquist, and a set design by Richard Harmon and costumes by Howard Behar, with Norma Fire, Paul Hebron, Sonja Lanzener, David Adamson, Vincent Niemann, Gene Santarelli, Laurine Towler, Joseph Reed, Michael Preston, and David Carlyon, who was also Clown Master. It was directed by Maureen Clarke, who during these years had been serving as Resident Text Coach for the company. Opening night was rained-out – a condition surprisingly encountered by Riverside tours only infrequently; the opening night performance was played in the main sanctuary of West Park Presbyterian Church.  Shrew then went on to tour all five boroughs in blazing heat, attracting large audiences for this lively show.

The Riverside School for Shakespeare and the First Folio

To train actors, directors, and teachers in the performance of the classic text of Shakespeare and his contemporaries, the company began its professional training program, The Riverside School for Shakespeare, in the fall of 1980, at The Shakespeare Center, headed by John Clingerman.

Actor training classes were offered by company members with professional performance experience and training in the classics: in verse, stage combat, movement and Commedia dell'arte.  Among the teaching staff were Marya Lowery, Robert Walsh, Maureen Clarke, Eric Hoffmann, Joel Leffert, John Carroll, Robert Mooney, Peter Siiteri, Dan Southern and Timothy Oman.  Numerous special guests offered workshops, such as Raúl Juliá, Barnard Hughes, Roger Rees, and Paul Rogers.

The Riverside Shakespeare Company also began to host residencies for actor training with verse by noted Shakespeare teachers Cicely Berry (in her first such workshops in New York City), and Patrick Tucker from the Royal Shakespeare Company for training American actors in use of Shakespeare's First Folio as a cornerstone of professional stage performance.

According to Backstage:

Initiated in the fall of 1980, The Riverside School for Shakespeare has been expanded to train actors in areas of Renaissance language, thought, movement as well as stage combat and other Renaissance performance styles, focusing on the preparation of the serious professional actor for the performance of Shakespearean and other Renaissance dramas.  The RSC actor training program has been set up by RSC's Artistic Director, W. Stuart McDowell, and by the program's director, John Clingerman.  The courses will cover the breadth of Renaissance stage acting, offered by a staff of instructors with professional experience gained through work with the only Shakespeare company performing year-round in N.Y.C.

The First Folio
It has been acknowledged (in the Introduction to first popular paperback reissue of Shakespeare's First Folio) that Patrick Tucker's intensive workshops first produced in New York by the Riverside Shakespeare Company in 1982 lead to a resurgence of interest in the First Folio by actors, teachers and directors in New York City, and to an awakening to the possibilities of playing Shakespeare from cue scripts, eventually leading to the popular reissue of Folio texts now widely used in this country.

The Shakespeare Project

In October 1983, the Riverside Shakespeare Company launched The Shakespeare Project, New York City's first major residency of actors from the Royal Shakespeare Company – with Edwin Richfield (of the RSC's highly acclaimed The Greeks), Heather Canning (of Paul Scofield's Macbeth), Christopher Ravenscroft (from the Royal Shakespeare Company's Nicholas Nickleby, Jennie Stoller and John Kane (the later two from Peter Brook's landmark production of A Midsummer Night's Dream) – conducting workshops and seminars and performing The Merchant of Venice, Dylan Thomas' Under Milk Wood, and the New York premiere of D. H. Lawrence's The Tarnished Phoenix, with a host committee of Henry Guettel, Leonard Bernstein, José Ferrer, Helen Hayes, Bernard Hughes, Bernard Jacobs, John V. Lindsay, Joshua Logan, and George Plimpton.

As Christopher Ravenscroft said on opening night of The Shakespeare Project, "I would really like to tell the Americans that they already have the talent and the technique.  All they need is the practice to take the horror out of Shakespeare."

During these years, the Riverside Shakespeare Company and The Shakespeare Center gained support from numerous major benefits staged for the theatre company by Jeremy Irons, Sinéad Cusack, Roger Rees, Nicol Williamson, Andre Gregory, Raúl Juliá, Jim Dale, and by Tony Award-nominee Edward Petherbridge, (from the Royal Shakespeare Company's Nicholas Nickleby) in his one-person show, Acting Natural. In the early 1980s, Riverside's board of directors was headed by Judith Radasch, followed by  Donna Lindsay-Goodwin.  Riverside's Advisory Board during this period included Shakespeare scholars Dr. Marvin Rosenberg and Dr. Bernard Beckerman, as well as noted stage directors and actors Zoe Caldwell, José Ferrer, Ruth Gordon, Helen Hayes, John Hirsch, Barnard Hughes, Mary Beth Hurt, Raúl Juliá, Garson Kannin, Stacey Keach, Joshua Logan, Mildred Natwick, Trevor Nunn, Roger Rees, Milo O'Shea, Sam Waterston and Joanne Woodward.

Riverside presents A Christmas Carol with Helen Hayes

In 1985, Helen Hayes appeared in an all-star benefit performance for the Riverside Shakespeare Company of Charles Dickens' A Christmas Carol, with Miss Hayes in her return to the New York stage as Narrator, featuring Len Cariou as Scrooge, Bille Brown of the Royal Shakespeare Company, MacIntyre Dixon, Celeste Holm, Raúl Juliá, Mary Elizabeth Mastrantonio, Harold Scott, Carole Shelley, and Fritz Weaver, staged with an original score for the Brass Quintet by W. Stuart McDowell, sung by the Children's Choir from the Anglo-American School of Manhattan, and an original script by Bille Brown, at the Symphony Space on the Upper Westside of Manhattan.

In 1986 the popular benefit presentation of A Christmas Carol was remounted, again with Helen Hayes, at the Marquis Theatre on Broadway, featuring F. Murray Abraham as Scrooge, with Ossie Davis, June Havoc, Rex Smith, Jean Marsh, MacIntyre Dixon, Alec Baldwin, and the choir of the Anglo-American School, produced by McDowell and directed by Robert Small.

And beyond
W. Stuart McDowell left Riverside in 1986 to found McDowell/Scripps Productions with arts benefactor, Samuel H. Scripps, and is now Chair of the Department of Theatre Dance and Motion Pictures at Wright State University in Dayton, Ohio. Gloria Skurski went on to a career in television, joining the staff of CBS News as Associate Producer in 1984, and is now director of educational and broadcast services for PBS ThinkTV of Dayton Ohio.

Beginning in 1986, the Riverside Shakespeare Company was led by Robert Small, followed by Timothy W. Oman, who moved the company to permanent off-Broadway status at Playhouse 91, located on East 91st Street on the upper Eastside of Manhattan, where it was subsequently led by Gus Kaikkonen.  In its second decade, until it disbanded in 1997, the Riverside Shakespeare Company produced a number of shows with distinguished actors and directors such as Henderson Forsythe, Beth Fowler, David Edward Jones, Charles Keating, Laurie Kennedy, Robert Sean Leonard, Stephen McHattie, Austin Pendleton, and Stuart Vaughan.

During its fifteenth year, the theatre company was praised in the weekly publication The Nation for producing "the most dependably accomplished performances of Shakespeare's plays regularly available in New York City."

In its twenty years of work as a theatre and educational training center, the Riverside Shakespeare Company presented over one hundred Equity productions, benefits and radio broadcasts of works by Shakespeare, Marlowe, Brecht, Machiavelli, and Shaw, as well as premieres of plays and Commedia dell'arte scenari.  Its educational programs provided training for hundreds of actors, directors and teachers and students.  Over its two decades Riverside productions were seen and heard by over one hundred thousand people throughout the five boroughs of New York City.

Riverside Shakespeare reunion, 2008
On March 24, 2008, the first annual reunion of former Riverside Shakespeare Company actors, directors, composers, and designers was held at the Marriott Marquis, in New York City.

Present at the reunion were company members Kevin Lee Allen, Kieron Murphy, Scott Parson, Jim Maxson, Gloria Skurski, Margo Gruber, W. Stuart McDowell, Michael Canick, Andrew Achsen, Herman Petras, Robert Mooney, Eric Hoffmann, and Dan Southern (aka Dan Smith).

Also present were Lisa Graham Parson, Pedro Ruiz, Cindy Ratzlaff, Charles Borkas, and photographer Claire McDowell.

See also

References

Further reading 
 Riverside Shakespeare Company in Shakespeare Companies and Festivals: An International Guide (1995)

Shakespearean theatre companies
Arts organizations based in New York City
Shakespeare festivals in the United States
Arts organizations established in 1977
Arts organizations disestablished in the 20th century
1977 establishments in New York City
1997 disestablishments in New York (state)
Defunct Theatre companies in New York City